Ali Fayyad (born 1962 in Tayibe) is a Lebanese Member of Parliament representing the Marjeyoun/Hasbaya district. He was elected in June 2009. He is also Director of the Studies and The Documentation Center in Lebanon.

See also
 Members of the 2009-2013 Lebanese Parliament
 Hezbollah

References

Living people
Members of the Parliament of Lebanon
Lebanese Shia Muslims
Hezbollah politicians
1962 births
People from Marjeyoun District
Lebanese University alumni